Florentina can refer to:

Saint Florentina, Spanish saint 
Andreea Florentina Grigore, a Romanian artistic gymnast
Florentina Bunea, Romanian statistician
Florentina Marincu, Romanian track and field athlete
Florentina Mosora, Romanian and Belgian biophysicist
Florentina Nedelcu, Romanian female volleyball player
Florentina Spânu, Romanian football player
Mother Ascensión Nicol Goñi, also known as Florentina Nicol Goñi 
321 Florentina, an asteroid
Littera Florentina
A Latin adjectival form for the city of Florence
Malus florentina, a species of Malus (apple)
 Florentina, a fictional town in Sacred videogame.

See also
Florentin (disambiguation)
Florentine (disambiguation)

Romanian feminine given names